Tobe Leysen (born 9 March 2002) is a Belgian professional footballer who plays for Genk.

Club career 
Leysen is a youth exponent from Genk. He made his league debut on 10 May 2022 against Sporting Charleroi.

Family 
He's the brother of PSV Eindhoven's Fedde Leysen.

References 

2002 births
Living people
Belgian footballers
Belgium youth international footballers
K.R.C. Genk players
Belgian Pro League players
Jong Genk players
Challenger Pro League players